Daniel Rose (born 11 December 2003) is a professional footballer currently playing as a goalkeeper for the Marshall Thundering Herd college team. Born in England, he has represented the Republic of Ireland at youth international level.

Club career
Born in Wilmslow, Rose started his career with childhood club Manchester City, before being released at a young age. He would go on to spend the next four seasons with Everton.

Linked with German side Schalke 04 for six months, Rose's move to Gelsenkirchen seemed to be in jeopardy due to the COVID-19 pandemic in Germany. However, after sending a text in German to Schalke's transfer negotiator, the deal was resurrected, and Rose completed the move in June 2020. As Rose had turned down the offer of a scholarship with Everton, the Merseyside club were due compensation from the deal.

On 17 December 2022, it was announced that Rose joined the Marshall Thundering Herd college team.

International career
Rose is eligible to represent both England and the Republic of Ireland, as his mother is Irish. He has expressed his desire to play for the Republic of Ireland.

References

2003 births
Living people
Irish people of English descent
People from Wilmslow
Republic of Ireland association footballers
Republic of Ireland youth international footballers
English footballers
Association football goalkeepers
Manchester City F.C. players
Everton F.C. players
FC Schalke 04 players
Marshall Thundering Herd men's soccer players
Republic of Ireland expatriate association footballers
Irish expatriate sportspeople in Germany
Expatriate footballers in Germany